Kattankudy Divisional Secretariat is a  Divisional Secretariat  of Batticaloa District, of Eastern Province, Sri Lanka.

GS Divisions and Population (2014) 

Source: http://www.kattankudy.ds.gov.lk

References
 Divisional Secretariats Portal

Divisional Secretariats of Batticaloa District